Epeli Rabua (born 24 October 1998) is a Fijian swimmer. He competed in the men's 50 metre breaststroke event at the 2017 World Aquatics Championships.

References

External links
 

1998 births
Living people
Fijian male swimmers
Place of birth missing (living people)
Male breaststroke swimmers
Swimmers at the 2022 Commonwealth Games
Commonwealth Games competitors for Fiji
20th-century Fijian people
21st-century Fijian people